Roman Přibyl (born 16 August 1973) is a retired Czech football striker.

References

1973 births
Living people
Czech footballers
FK Drnovice players
MŠK Rimavská Sobota players
MFK Karviná players
FC Vysočina Jihlava players
Association football forwards
Czech First League players
Czech expatriate footballers
Expatriate footballers in Slovakia
Czech expatriate sportspeople in Slovakia
1. SC Znojmo players